Tom Langmyer is an American author, broadcast executive and media consultant.

He is currently CEO of Great Lakes Media Corp.

Langmyer was previously vice president of news/talk/sports radio programming for E. W. Scripps Company and he also served as vice president and general manager of Scripps' Milwaukee radio stations WTMJ (AM) and WKTI.  Langmyer joined Scripps in 2013.  He previously was vice president and general manager of WGN (AM) in Chicago and KMOX (AM) in St. Louis.  He also served as national VP of news/talk formats for CBS Radio.

He began his career in his hometown of Buffalo, New York and later worked for stations in Youngstown, Ohio, Syracuse, New York, New York City and Pittsburgh, Pennsylvania.

In 2018, he was named to the Buffalo Broadcasters Association Hall of Fame.

Great Lakes author

Langmyer's book, Lake Erie: History and Views was published in 2010. The 312-page hardcover book was written to educate readers on the history of Lake Erie and the surrounding region.  The account combines narration, factual summaries, historic photographs, engravings, maps, and antique postcards from Langmyer's collection as well as current photographs.  Starting with the creation of Lake Erie during the Ice Age, the story describes the lake's discovery by Europeans, the battles for its control, how people settled and developed the region around the lake, and how the population grew along its shores. The "Circle of Cities and Towns" group of chapters, covers the history of most municipalities around the lake. The reader is also taken behind the scenes aboard a 1,000-foot lakeboat, the Walter J. McCarthy Jr., on a journey up the Great Lakes.

References

External links
Great Lakes Media Corp, (website for broadcasting ownership and consulting firm): 
Lake Erie: History and Views, (website for the book, Lake Erie: History and Views, which chronicles the history of the Lake Erie region in the U.S. and Canada):<ref>
Toxins in Lake Erie, A Study by Case Western Reserve University: 
Grove City College Alumni News, Alumni honored for achievements: 
Radio Ink Magazine, 2015 Radio Wayne Award Winner 

American radio personalities
American radio executives
Place of birth missing (living people)
Year of birth missing (living people)
21st-century American historians
21st-century American male writers
Living people
American male non-fiction writers